James Parkinson (1755–1824) was an English apothecary, surgeon, geologist, paleontologist and political activist, for whom Parkinson's disease is named.

James Parkinson may also refer to:

James Parkinson (controversialist) (1653–1722), English academic and schoolmaster, known as a polemical writer
James Parkinson (museum proprietor) (1730–1813), English land agent and museum proprietor
James Parkinson (Irish politician) (died 1948), Irish Cumann na nGaedheal and Fine Gael senator
James W. Parkinson (born 1949), American lawyer and activist
James Parkinson (footballer), English footballer, during 1888–1889 season
Jimmy Parkinson, of Barleyjuice
Jimmy Parkinson, Australian singer who presented The Jimmy Parkinson Show
Jim Parkinson (born 1941), American type designer